Adam Adli Abd Halim (born July 3, 1989) is a Malaysian politician and student activist who has served as the Deputy Minister of Youth and Sports in the Pakatan Harapan (PH) administration under Prime Minister Anwar Ibrahim and Minister Hannah Yeoh Tseow Suan since December 2022 and the Member of Parliament (MP) for Hang Tuah Jaya since November 2022. He is a member of the People's Justice Party (PKR), a component party of the PH coalition. He has also served as the 5th Youth Chief of PKR and Deputy Youth Chief of PH since July 2022.

Personal life
Adli studied at the Sultan Idris Education University. On 9 January 2013, Adli was suspended for three semesters, which ended in September for tarnishing the university's name and disturbing public peace and safety.

Political career 
On 16 September 2021, Adam Adli officially joined the People's Justice Party, along with 20 other young activists and student leaders, including lawyer Asheeq Ali, and activist Sarah Hadi. After the 2022 People's Justice Party leadership elections, he was elected as youth chief for the party for the 2022-2026 term.

Legal Battle

Sedition charges 
On 13 May 2013, Adam Adli was arrested over the statements he made during a forum held at the Selangor Chinese Assembly Hall in Kuala Lumpur. He was arrested at 3:15 PM on 18 May 2013 under Section 4(1) of the Sedition Act. Adli was handcuffed at his office in Bangsar will be charged with sedition and is being investigated under Section 125b of the Penal Code, for acting in a manner detrimental to Malaysia's parliamentary democracy.

On 19 May 2013, Adli was remanded by the Malaysian authorities for five days until 23 May following his arrest for sedition. City police chief Deputy Comm Datuk Mohmad Salleh said the remand order was to help police investigate Adam Adli on statements he made during a 13 May forum.

Adam Adli was charged under Section 4 of the Sedition Act on 23 May 2013 in Kuala Lumpur.

On 22 February 2018, Adam Adli was acquitted of his sedition charge. The judge states that "the conviction was unsafe due to several misdirections in law", during the Sessions and High Courts verdicts. With him being a free man, Adam Adli continued his studies at the Sultan Idris University of Education.

Election results

References 

Living people
Place of birth missing (living people)
Malaysian activists
Malaysian people of Malay descent
1989 births
Sultan Idris Education University alumni